Stanley or Stan Davies may refer to:

Stanley Webb Davies (1894–1978), English furniture maker
Stan Davies (1898–1972), Welsh footballer
Stan Gebler Davies (1943–1994), Irish journalist

See also 
 Stan Davis (disambiguation)